Crassula deceptor is a succulent plant native to South Africa and Namibia. This species occurs from southern Namibia, to as far south as the town of Vanrhynsdorp in South Africa.

The leaves of this variable species are produced in four compact ranks, and have hard papillae.

References

deceptor
Flora of the Cape Provinces
Flora of Namibia